Khusropur  is a village in Kapurthala district of Punjab State, India. The village is administrated by a Sarpanch who is an elected representative of village.

Demography 
According to the report published by Census India in 2011, Khusropur has 169 houses with the total population of 884 persons of which 479 are male and 405 females. Literacy rate of  Khusropur is 74.43%, lower than the state average of 75.84%.  The population of children in the age group 0–6 years is 94 which is 10.63% of the total population.  Child sex ratio is approximately 709, lower than the state average of 846.

Population data

References

External links 
  Villages in Kapurthala
 Kapurthala Villages List

Villages in Kapurthala district